The men's shot put event at the 2015 Summer Universiade was held on 8 July at the Gwangju Universiade Main Stadium.

Results

References

Shot
2015